Camp Adams was a former American Civil War training camp that existed in 1861 in Quincy, Massachusetts. It was first occupied on 5 July 1861 by Cobb's Light Artillery. On 8 August the unit relocated to Baltimore, Maryland and established Camp Andrew.

See also
 List of military installations in Massachusetts

References

Installations of the U.S. Army in Massachusetts
Quincy, Massachusetts
1861 establishments in Massachusetts